Didier Gonzales (born September 14, 1960 in Sidi Bel Abbès) is a member of the National Assembly of France.  He represents the Val-de-Marne department,  and is a member of the Union for a Popular Movement.

References

1960 births
Living people
People from Sidi Bel Abbès
Pieds-Noirs
Union for a Popular Movement politicians
Deputies of the 13th National Assembly of the French Fifth Republic
Mayors of places in Île-de-France
French people of Portuguese descent